Frank W. Patrick (October 3, 1915 – September 26, 1992) was an American football player who played two seasons with the Chicago Cardinals of the National Football League (NFL). He was drafted by the Cardinals in the third round of the 1938 NFL Draft. He played college football at the University of Pittsburgh and attended Roosevelt High School in East Chicago, Indiana. Patrick was head coach of the Puget Sound Loggers from 1946 to 1948. He was also an assistant coach for the Penn State Nittany Lions from 1949 to 1973.

References

External links
Just Sports Stats
College stats

1915 births
1992 deaths
Players of American football from Indiana
American football running backs
Pittsburgh Panthers football players
Chicago Cardinals players
Puget Sound Loggers football coaches
Penn State Nittany Lions football coaches
Sportspeople from East Chicago, Indiana